Avnei Eitan is an Israeli settlement organized as a moshav in the southern Golan Heights, located at an elevation of  above sea level. Located to the east of the Sea of Galilee, it falls under the municipal jurisdiction of Golan Regional Council. It is part of the Hapoel HaMizrachi movement.

The international community considers Israeli settlements in the Golan Heights illegal under international law, but the Israeli government disputes this.

History
Part of the families lived temporarily in the nearby settlement Nov, and later Avnei Eitan was founded in 1978. The settlement is named after six war victims including 3 soldiers that were killed in the Yom Kippur War, and a woman that deceased from a serious illness.

In December 1991, members of the moshav left the settlement and moved to live three kilometers east of it, near the ceasefire line fence between Israel and Syria. The moshav, which belongs to the Hapoel HaMizrachi movement, was shut down in protest of foreclosures on property and money carried out by the banks. Members that left the moshav burned tires at the entrance to the settlement and later confronted IDF officers, who demanded that they evacuate the place because they posed a security risk. Police forces, under the command of the Golan Heights Police Chief, back then Superintendent Shimon Koren, also arrived at the scene and addressed the strikers with a similar demand. At the same time, the police prevented roadblocks and major traffic routes in the Golan Heights. The Golan Heights police arrested four moshav members for questioning.

Geography
The nearby stream, Nahal El Al (Hebrew) or Wadi Dafila (Arabic) is a popular hiking destination and contains the Black Waterfall, named for its black basalt rock and located closest to Avnei Eitan, and the White Waterfall, named for its white limestone rock.

Details 
Avnei Eitan is an Orthodox Jewish agricultural community in Gush Hispin, a bloc of religious communities in the southern Golan Heights. The moshav receives municipal services from the Golan Regional Council.

About 130 families live in Avnei Eitan, including families evicted from Gush Katif, mainly from Netzer Hazani and Kfar Darom.

The community has hosted the Mechinat Avnei Eitan pre-military yeshiva, also known as the "Leadership Yeshiva Academy," attended mainly by English-speaking overseas students. Many graduates of the school serve in elite units in the Israel Defense Forces.

See also
Israeli-occupied territories

References

Moshavim
Golan Regional Council
Religious Israeli settlements
Populated places in Northern District (Israel)
Populated places established in 1978
1978 establishments in the Israeli Military Governorate